Roman Mukhadinovich Uzdenov (born 10 March 1979) is a Kazakh football coach and a former forward. He also holds Russian citizenship.

He also has caps in the Kazakhstan national football team.

Career statistics

International goals

References

External links
 

1979 births
Sportspeople from Nalchik
Living people
Association football forwards
Kazakhstani footballers
Kazakhstani expatriate footballers
Kazakhstan international footballers
FC Dynamo Moscow reserves players
PFC Spartak Nalchik players
FC Anzhi Makhachkala players
FC Khimki players
FC Zhenis Astana players
Expatriate footballers in Russia
FC Volgar Astrakhan players
Russian Premier League players
Kazakhstani football managers